The Grace Episcopal Church is an Episcopal church designed by noted American architect H. H. Richardson, with a major stained glass window by John LaFarge. It is located at 160 High Street, Medford, Massachusetts and now listed on the National Register of Historic Places.

The church was constructed 1867-1869. It is one of Richardson's earliest works and the second of his churches (now the earliest remaining since his Unity Church, Springfield, has been demolished). Its cornerstone was laid in 1867 but by August 1868 it was evident that construction costs would exceed the budget. After the Brooks family covered the remaining construction costs, it became a private chapel under Episcopal law. In 1873 the family delivered the church to the parish, and it then was consecrated by the Bishop of Maine.

A massive slate roof, in gray with bands of red slate, dominates the nave's low walls and the five-sided apse attached to its east wall.

The church has undergone extensive modifications from its original design. In 1882 a Sunday school annex was appended, in 1883 the nave interior was redecorated, and in 1957 further additions were made. In 1962 the chancel was reworked and Richardson's original altar given to the Brooklyn Museum. In the early 1970s Richardson's dark-stained interior was replaced by a brighter woodwork. As of 2007 only the pulpit remains of his original interior. LaFarge's window, "Rebecca at the Well", forms the center of the nave's south wall, and was probably installed in 1884 or 1885.

Gallery

See also
National Register of Historic Places listings in Medford, Massachusetts
National Register of Historic Places listings in Middlesex County, Massachusetts

References

External links
 Grace Church, Medford

Episcopal church buildings in Massachusetts
Henry Hobson Richardson church buildings
Churches on the National Register of Historic Places in Massachusetts
Richardsonian Romanesque architecture in Massachusetts
Romanesque Revival church buildings in Massachusetts
Buildings and structures in Medford, Massachusetts
Churches in Middlesex County, Massachusetts
Stone churches in Massachusetts
National Register of Historic Places in Medford, Massachusetts